Diah Tri Lestari (born 7 March 1997) is an Indonesian footballer who plays a defender for Asprov Jabar and the Indonesia women's national team.

Club career
Tri has played for Asprov Jabar in Indonesia.

International career 
Tri represented Indonesia at the 2022 AFC Women's Asian Cup.

Honours

Club
Persib Putri
 Liga 1 Putri: 2019

References

External links

1997 births
Living people
Sportspeople from Bandung
Indonesian women's footballers
Women's association football defenders
Indonesia women's international footballers